The Reggie Lewis Track and Athletic Center (RLTAC) is an indoor track and indoor basketball stadium in Roxbury, Massachusetts, partially funded by the state of Massachusetts. It is home to numerous MIAA indoor track and field conferences, along with the MIAA State Championships and the New England High School Championships. Nike Indoor Nationals have been run there since 2008, and the Boston Indoor Games have been run there since their inception. USATF Masters Indoor Championships have been held at the facilities several times.

History
The Center was named after Reggie Lewis, a former college basketball player for Northeastern University and professional player for the Boston Celtics. On April 29, 1993, he collapsed on the floor of the Boston Garden while playing a game against the Charlotte Hornets. On July 27, 1993, he suffered sudden cardiac death during an off-season practice at Brandeis University.

March 2014 centenarian masters track and field athlete, LeLand McPhie (age 100), won gold medals in the weight throw, superweight throw and shot put.

Facilities

Track and field
The Reggie Lewis Center has a 200-meter indoor Mondo Super X track, with areas for the high jump, long/triple jump, pole vault, and a 55/60 meter dash runway on the infield. There is a shot put cage in the corner of the stadium, however during professional meets (such as the Boston Indoor Games), the shot put is usually held on the infield where it is more visible to all spectators. It seats 3,500 people.

The Reggie Lewis Center track and field facility is generally regarded as one of the premier facilities in the Northeastern United States, and is also one of the premier facilities in the United States as a whole. The venue has hosted the Boston Indoor Games meeting every year since 1996. It played host to the USA Indoor Track and Field Championships on multiple occasions.

Basketball
The Reggie Lewis Center also features a basketball gymnasium that can seat up to 1,300 people. It also has provisions for volleyball and wrestling.

Other
Also in the Center is a dance studio, a weight and fitness room, shower/locker facilities, seminar rooms, and more. The field house and gymnasium can also both be used for meetings and seminars on a larger scale. The annual Boston Vegetarian Food Festival has been held there for 15 of its 17 annual iterations, drawing tens of thousands of attendees.
Lastly, The Reggie Lewis Center also houses Bay State Physical Therapy. One of Boston's best outpatient physical therapy clinics, where they provide services to residents of the Roxbury community as well as the Metro Boston area.

Principal tenants
While there are many tenants of the Reggie Lewis Center, some include:
 The Roxbury Community College basketball team
 Boston Indoor Games
 Nike Indoor Nationals
 ECAC Conference Championships in indoor track
 Northeast 10 Conference Championships in indoor track
 New England High School Championships in indoor track
 MIAA State Championships in indoor track
 Massachusetts State Track Coaches Association (for their various indoor track meets)
 Tri County Track and Field League
 Bay State Conference (track and field)
 Dual County League (track and field)
 Old Colony League (track and field)
 Atlantic Coast League (track and field)
 Patriot League (track and field)
 Hockomock League (track and field)
 Middlesex League (track and field)
 Merrimack Valley Conference (track and field)

Facility records
The following are the top marks ever set at the Reggie Lewis track:

Men

Women

References

External links
 Official Site

Roxbury, Boston
Roxbury Community College
Northeastern University buildings
College indoor track and field venues in the United States
Indoor track and field venues in the United States
Sports venues in Boston
College basketball venues in the United States
Athletics (track and field) venues in Massachusetts
Basketball venues in Massachusetts
1995 establishments in Massachusetts
Sports venues completed in 1995